The 2004–05 Turkish Second League Category A was the second-level football league of Turkey and the 42nd season since its establishment in 1963–64. At the end of the season in which 18 teams competed in a single group, Sivasspor, Manisaspor and Kayseri Erciyesspor, which finished the league in the first three places, were promoted to the upper league, while Sarıyer, Adanaspor and Fatih Karagümrük, which were in the last three places, were relegated.

Final standings

Results

Top goalscorers

References 

 

TFF First League seasons
Turkey
1